Ro-25, originally named Submarine No. 43, was an Imperial Japanese Navy Kaichū-Type submarine of the Kaichū III subclass. She was commissioned in 1921 and operated in the waters of Japan and Formosa. She sank after a collision in 1924, and after salvage and repairs returned to service from 1925 to 1936.

Design and description
They displaced  surfaced and  submerged.

For surface running, the submarines were powered by two  Sulzer Mark II diesel engines, each driving one propeller shaft. When submerged each propeller was driven by a  electric motor. They could reach  on the surface and  underwater.

The submarines were armed with six  torpedo tubes, four internal tubes in the bow and two external tubes mounted on the upper deck, and carried a total of ten Type 44 torpedoes. They were also armed with a single  deck gun mounted aft of the conning tower.

Construction and commissioning

Ro-25 was laid down as Submarine No. 43 on 19 February 1920 by the Sasebo Naval Arsenal at Sasebo, Japan. Launched on 17 July 1920, she was completed and commissioned on 25 October 1921.

Service history

Upon commissioning, Submarine No. 43 was attached to the Sasebo Naval District, to which she remained attached throughout her career. On 15 December 1921, she was assigned to Submarine Division 22 and to the Mako Defense Division at Mako in the Pescadores Islands. On 1 December 1922, Submarine Division 22 was reassigned to the Sasebo Defense Division.

On 19 March 1924, Submarine No. 43 was taking part in maneuvers off the harbor at Sasebo when she collided with the light cruiser . Using a telephone floated from the sunken submarine, a rescue party on the surface established contact with the crewmen trapped aboard her, who reported ever-deteriorating conditions before falling silent about ten hours after she sank. Submarine No. 43′s entire crew of 46 suffocated.

Submarine No. 43 was partially raised and towed to Sasebo, where she arrived on 13 April 1924 so that salvage operations could be completed in the protected waters of the harbor. She was fully refloated on 25 April 1924 and on 26 April was decommissioned and placed in reserve in the Sasebo Naval District to undergo repairs. While under repair, she was renamed Ro-25 on 1 November 1924. Her repairs were completed on 4 May 1925, and on 1 March 1926 she was recommissioned and returned to service in both Submarine Division 22 and the Sasebo Defense Division. On 1 December 1927 she was reassigned directly to the Sasebo Naval District and subsequently was used for trials.

Ro-25 was stricken from the Navy list on 1 April 1936. She subsequently was scrapped during 1936.

Commemoration

The Submarine No. 43 Memorial, a gray obelisk commemorating the 1924 sinking of Submarine No. 43, stands on Udogoe, overlooking Sasebo. It provides a vantage point from which visitors can see the area in which she sank.

Notes

References
, History of Pacific War Vol.17 I-Gō Submarines, Gakken (Japan), January 1998, 
Rekishi Gunzō, History of Pacific War Extra, "Perfect guide, The submarines of the Imperial Japanese Forces", Gakken (Japan), March 2005, 
The Maru Special, Japanese Naval Vessels No.43 Japanese Submarines III, Ushio Shobō (Japan), September 1980, Book code 68343-44
The Maru Special, Japanese Naval Vessels No.132 Japanese Submarines I "Revised edition", Ushio Shobō (Japan), February 1988, Book code 68344-36
The Maru Special, Japanese Naval Vessels No.133 Japanese Submarines II "Revised edition", Ushio Shobō (Japan), March 1988, Book code 68344-37
The Maru Special, Japanese Naval Vessels No.135 Japanese Submarines IV, Ushio Shobō (Japan), May 1988, Book code 68344-39

External links
Photo of Submarine No. 43 Memorial at Wayfarer Daves Travel and History

Ro-16-class submarines
Kaichū type submarines
Ships built by Sasebo Naval Arsenal
1920 ships
Maritime incidents in 1924
Shipwrecks of Japan
Submarines sunk in collisions
Warships lost with all hands
Japanese submarine accidents